For Freedom is a 1940 British drama film directed by Maurice Elvey and Castleton Knight. It was made largely for propaganda purposes during the Second World War.  It features Will Fyffe, Guy Middleton, and Terry-Thomas.
 Through its blending of fiction and documentary it was similar to The Lion Has Wings produced by Alexander Korda's London Films.

The film portrays the early events of the war, particularly the Battle of the River Plate, from the point of view of a British newsreel production company.

Cast
 Will Fyffe as Chief
 Anthony Hulme as Steve
 E.V.H. Emmett as Ted
 Guy Middleton as Pierre
 Albert Lieven as Fritz
 Hugh McDermott as Sam
 Arthur Goullet as Ivan
 Terry-Thomas as Newsreader 
 Captain Dove as himself
 Captain Pottinger as himself 
 First Officer Murphy as himself
 Engineer Walker as himself
 Engineer Angel as himself
 John Ernest Harper as himself

References

Bibliography
 Chapman, James. The British at War: Cinema, State, and Propaganda, 1939-1945. I.B. Tauris Publishers, 1998.

External links

1940 films
British World War II propaganda films
1940s English-language films
Films directed by Castleton Knight
Films directed by Maurice Elvey
1940s war drama films
British war drama films
British black-and-white films
Films set in London
Gainsborough Pictures films
Seafaring films
Films set in Montevideo
1940 drama films
Films scored by Walter Goehr